The Admiral Lazarev class was a pair of monitors built for the Imperial Russian Navy in the late 1860s, which designated them as armored turret frigates. Four ships were ordered, but the last two were significantly modified during construction and became the separate . The sister ships were assigned to the Baltic Fleet upon completion and remained there for their entire careers. Aside from one accidental collision, their careers were uneventful. They were reclassified as coast-defense ironclads in 1892 before they became training ships later that decade. The Admiral Lazarevs were stricken from the Navy List in 1907 and 1909; both were sold for scrap in 1912.

Design and description
By late 1863, the Russian Admiralty Board had begun planning for the second generation of ironclads to succeed those ships then under construction. They ordered eight ships, two fully rigged seagoing types and six coastal defense ships, in March 1864. The British shipbuilder Charles Mitchell submitted four different designs for the coastal defense vessels, two broadside ironclads and two turret ships. The Shipbuilding Technical Committee decided in August that the broadside designs would be based on the hull shape of the earlier  for better seaworthiness, but they would be armed with fewer, but more powerful guns, than the numerous smoothbore guns of the older ships. Two variants were worked out that differed in the fineness of the hull and draft.

In November 1864 the committee decided to revise the designs to use three gun turrets, each armed with a pair of massive American-designed  Rodman guns, although the armament was changed to  rifled muzzle-loading guns two months later. On 24 May 1865, Admiral Lazarev and Admiral Grieg were ordered to the deeper-draft version of the two designs, while Admiral Chicagov and Admiral Spiridov used the shallower-draft version. Construction of the ships was repeatedly delayed by design changes and delayed deliveries of components. Both of the most significant design changes were related to the armor protection. Shortly after they were ordered the Admiralty Board realized that the specified  armor would be outclassed by the latest rifled gun and decided that the existing armor would be reinforced by an additional  armor plate and additional wooden backing inside the existing armor. The second change occurred after new  rifled guns were able to penetrate a replica of the armor scheme in June 1866. The Admiralty Board decided to significantly thicken the armor of all four ships and remove one gun turret to compensate for the weight of the extra armor in November, but Admiral Lazarev and Admiral Grieg were too far advanced to make the change and only the other two ships were modified.

The ships were designed to displace , but turned out to be overweight and actually displaced . They were fitted with a plough-shaped ram. The Admiral Lazarevs had a double bottom and their hulls were subdivided by six main watertight bulkheads. Their crew consisted of 269–74 officers and crewmen.

Propulsion
The Admiral Lazarev-class ships had a single two-cylinder horizontal direct-acting steam engine. The monitors also had a donkey boiler for the small steam engine that powered the ventilation fans and pumps. They were fitted with a light fore-and-aft sailing rig with three pole masts and a bowsprit.

Armament
The monitors were ultimately designed to be armed with six 20-caliber, Obukhov 9-inch rifled guns, a pair in each Coles-type turret. Around 1874–1875 the guns were replaced by three  rifled guns, based on a Krupp design. Although their muzzle velocity was reduced to their , the range remained the same. During the Russo-Turkish War of 1877–1878, a 9-inch mortar was fitted to attack the thin deck armor of enemy ships, but accuracy was poor and they were later removed, probably in the early 1880s. An improved, more powerful, 22-caliber, 11-inch gun was installed aboard the sister ships during the 1880s.

By the early 1890s, the light armament consisted of one or two  Baranov QF guns, five  QF Hotchkiss guns, replacing the 4-pounders, and a pair  QF Hotchkiss five-barreled revolving cannon. The ships could also carry 12-15 mines intended to be used to create a secure anchorage.

Armor
The armor thinned to  aft and  forward of the main belt. This outermost layer of armor was backed by 9 inches of teak reinforced with angle irons and then came the  inner armor plates, backed in its turn by another 9 inches of teak.

The deck armor was in two layers with a total thickness of 1 inch that were separated by a layer of cloth or felt to better deflect the glancing hits expected.

Ships

Construction and service
After launching, the sisters were transferred to Kronstadt for fitting out as the shallow waters around Saint Petersburg prevented deep-draft ships from being completed. This added more delays as the dockyard there lacked the equipment to efficiently fit out the ships. Both ships were assigned to the Baltic Fleet upon completion and they were not fully equipped until around 1872. The monitor  accidentally rammed Admiral Lazarev in Kronstadt harbor on 22 October 1871. The former was only slightly damaged, but the latter had a  hole punched in its hull. Water poured in and the ship took on a list of 8° and nearly capsized before other ships in the harbor could use their pumps to reduce the flooding. The ship's watertight bulkheads proved to be poorly caulked and sealed and the commission that investigated the accident recommended that the bulkheads be tested during construction by intentionally flooding them. The Navy ignored this recommendation, which directly led to the loss of the coast-defense ship  in 1897. Another recommendation which was followed was to attach all of the ship's pumps to the bilges to allow a flooded compartment to be pumped out as quickly as possible. This modification was tested aboard Admiral Lazarevin 1872 and became standard practice for the navy.

The ships received electric dynamos and searchlights were installed in the late 1870s. Their boilers were replaced during the winter of 1881–1882. Steam-powered steering gear was installed in the sisters in 1887 and they were reclassified as coast-defense ironclads on 13 February 1892. By this time, their role in Russian war plans was to defend the Gulf of Riga against an anticipated German amphibious landing. A few years later they often served with the fleet's Artillery Training Detachment. Admiral Lazarev was transferred to the port of Libava as a guardship during the Russo-Japanese War of 1904–1905.

See also
 List of ironclads of Russia

Notes

Footnotes

References

Further reading
 

 
Ships built at the Baltic Shipyard